The 2018 Challenger Banque Nationale de Gatineau was a professional tennis tournament played on outdoor hard courts. It was the 3rd edition of the tournament for men and the 5th for women, and it was part of the 2018 ATP Challenger Tour and the 2018 ITF Women's Circuit. It took place in Gatineau, Canada between July 16 and 22, 2018.

Men's singles main-draw entrants

Seeds

1 Rankings are as of July 2, 2018.

Other entrants
The following players received wildcards into the singles main draw:
 Alexis Galarneau
 Pavel Krainik
 Samuel Monette
 Benjamin Sigouin

The following players received entry from the qualifying draw:
 Chung Yun-seong
 Jacob Grills
 Edan Leshem
 Ricardo Rodríguez

Women's singles main-draw entrants

Seeds

1 Rankings are as of July 2, 2018.

Other entrants
The following players received wildcards into the singles main draw:
 Bianca Andreescu
 Ariana Arseneault
 Layne Sleeth
 Alexandra Vagramov

The following player received entry as a special exempt:
 Maddison Inglis

The following players received entry from the qualifying draw:
 Alicia Barnett
 Jodie Anna Burrage
 Nadja Gilchrist
 Nagi Hanatani
 Mai Hontama
 Raveena Kingsley
 Catherine Leduc
 Jada Robinson

The following player received entry as a lucky loser:
 Samantha Murray

Champions

Men's singles

 Bradley Klahn def.  Ugo Humbert 6–3, 7–6(7–5).

Women's singles
 Astra Sharma def.  Victoria Rodríguez, 3–6, 6–4, 6–3

Men's doubles

 Robert Galloway /  Bradley Klahn def.  Darian King /  Peter Polansky 7–6(7–4), 4–6, [10–8].

Women's doubles
 Bianca Andreescu /  Carson Branstine def.  Hsu Chieh-yu /  Marcela Zacarías, 4–6, 6–2, [10–4]

External links
Official website 

2018 ATP Challenger Tour
2018 ITF Women's Circuit
2018
2018 in Canadian tennis